Frederick or Fred Phillips may refer to:
 Frederick Phillips (field hockey) (1884–1948), Welsh field hockey player, Olympic bronze 1908
 Sir Frederick Phillips (civil servant), British civil servant
 Fred Phillips (footballer) (1905–1933), Australian footballer
 Fred Phillips (make-up artist) (1908–1993), American make-up artist
 Freddie Phillips (died 2003), British film and television musician and composer
 Frederick Albert Phillips (1918–2011), governor of Saint Kitts and Nevis 1967–1969
 Ric Flair (born 1949), professional wrestler whose birth name has been recorded as Fred Phillips

See also
Frederick Philipse (disambiguation)